This is the discography of George S. Clinton.

Films

Clinton, George S.